Metasphenisca grandidieri is a species of tephritid or fruit flies in the genus Metasphenisca of the family Tephritidae.

References

Diptera of Africa
Insects described in 1924
Taxa named by Mario Bezzi
Tephritinae